The 1971 Utah State Aggies football team was an American football team that represented Utah State University as an independent during the 1971 NCAA University Division football season. In their fifth season under head coach Chuck Mills, the Aggies compiled an 8–3 record and outscored all opponents 243 to 183.

The team's statistical leaders included Tony Adams with 2,035 passing yards, Ed Giles with 510 rushing yards, Bob Wicks with 862 receiving yards, Jerry Hughes with 60 points scored (six touchdowns), Alan McMurray "Madpup" (soph all american) lead team with 104 tackles, (record 19.5 sacks) and Tom Murphy with 81 total tackles.

In December, the team traveled to Japan for two games against Japanese university students. The Aggies were the first American college football team to play a game in Japan since the sport was introduced there in the 1910s.

Schedule

References

Utah State
Utah State Aggies football seasons
Utah State Aggies football